Kobyletska Poliana (before 1899 or  after 1899; ,) is an urban-type settlement in Rakhiv Raion (district) of Zakarpattia Oblast (province) in western Ukraine. The town's population was 3,392 as of the 2001 Ukrainian Census. Current population: 

The settlement was first mentioned in 1672 as Kabola Poliana. In 1891, the population of the town was 1,406 and consisted of Hungarians and Rusyns.  In 1910, the settlement was a part of the Kingdom of Hungary, and had a population of 1,832 inhabitants, a mixture of Rusyns, Hungarians, and Germans. In 1941, the town's Jewish population was 427. In 1971, Kobyletska Poliana was granted the status of an urban-type settlement.

The town once housed the Church of the Ascension of the Lord, a wooden church dating back to the 16th century. A sign next to the building stated that a wooden bell tower was constructed next to the church in 1512. The church was destroyed by an act of vandalism in 1992.

People from Kobyletska Poliana
 Yosyp Bokshay (1891-1975), Ukrainian Soviet painter, awarded the Meritorious Patron of the Arts (1951), member of the Academy of Arts of the USSR (1958), People's Artist of Ukraine (1960), People's Artist of the USSR (1963). 
 David Weiss Halivni (1927), American-Israeli rabbi, scholar in the domain of Jewish Sciences and professor of Talmud.

See also
 Velykyi Bychkiv and Yasinia, the other two urban-type settlements in Rakhiv Raion of Zakarpattia Oblast

References

Urban-type settlements in Rakhiv Raion
1672 establishments in the Habsburg monarchy
17th-century establishments in Hungary